Capture may refer to:
Asteroid capture, a phenomenon in which an asteroid enters a stable orbit around another body
Capture, a software for lighting design, documentation and visualisation
"Capture" a song by Simon Townshend
Capture (band), an Australian electronicore band previously known as Capture the Crown
Capture (chess), to remove the opponent's piece from the board by taking it with one's own piece
Capture effect, a phenomenon in which only the stronger of two signals near the same FM frequency will be demodulated
Capture fishery, a wild fishery in which the aquatic life is not controlled and needs to be captured or fished
Capture (TV series), a reality show
The Capture (TV series), UK drama series
Electron capture, a nuclear reaction
Motion capture, the process of recording movement and translating that movement onto a digital model
Neutron capture, a nuclear reaction
Regulatory capture, situations in which a government agency created to act in the public interest instead acts in favor of other interests
Renault Captur, automobile model
Rule of capture, common law that determines ownership of captured natural resources including groundwater, oil, gas and game animals
Schematic capture, a step in electronic design automation at which the electronic schematic is created by a designer
Capture CIS, a software tool used for circuit schematic capture
Screen capture (disambiguation), an image taken by the computer to record the visible items
Stream capture, a geomorphological phenomenon occurring when a stream or river is diverted from its own bed
Video capture, the process of converting an analog video signal to digital form

See also
The Capture (disambiguation)